Georgia elected its members October 2, 1826.  Georgia switched to using districts for this election.  Two incumbents, James Meriwether and George Cary, did not run for re-election.

See also 
 1827 Georgia's 1st congressional district special election
 1827 Georgia's 2nd congressional district special election
 1826 and 1827 United States House of Representatives elections
 List of United States representatives from Georgia

Notes 

1826
Georgia
United States House of Representatives